Andrew Cephas is an American former Negro league shortstop who played in the 1930s.

Cephas played for the Birmingham Black Barons in 1938. In 14 recorded games, he posted four hits in 52 plate appearances.

References

External links
 and Seamheads

Year of birth missing
Place of birth missing
Birmingham Black Barons players
Baseball shortstops